Degilbo is a rural town and locality in the North Burnett Region, Queensland, Australia.

History
The name Degilbo was the name of a pastoral run owned by William Henry Walsh (a Member of the Queensland Legislative Council) in 1847. It is believed to be an Aboriginal word dackeel bo meaning sharp or upright stones. A very popular story is that Degilbo is actually the word obliged spelt backwards, attributed to a railway surveyor, who had to assign names to many railway stations, had run out of ideas but as he was obliged to come up with a name, he wrote that word down backwards. Being perhaps a more entertaining story, the story of the backwards spelling is frequently published, and is usually followed by a spate of correspondence pointing out that the name of the pastoral run preceded the railway station by at least 20 years.

The first Degilbo Post Office opened on 1 April 1893. It was renamed Woowoonga in 1894,  Appallan in 1897 and Degilbo in 1898. It closed in 1958.

Woowoonga Provisional School opened on 15 March 1894. In 1898 it was renamed Degilbo Provisional School and in January 1908 it became Degilbo State School. With only 11 students enrolled as at November 2007, the school was mothballed on 31 December 2007 before final closure on 5 June 2008. It was at 598 Gooroolba Road. The school's website was archived.

Woowoonga Creek Provisional School on 17 January 1898 and became Woowoonga Creek State School on 1 January 1909 only to close that same year. The school was just south of Woowoonga Creek.

Mount Appallan Provisional School opened on 4 August 1902. On 1 January 1909, it became Mount Appallan State School. It closed in 1953. It was at 33 Cheese Factory Road. It was named after Mount Appallan.

The Degilbo War Memorial was unveiled on Sunday 17 September 1922. It commemorates those who served and died in World War I. It is located beside the Isis Highway.

The Bicentennial National Trail passes Degilbo.

Heritage listings
Degilbo has a number of heritage-listed sites, including: 
  west of Degilbo on the Mungar-Monto railway line: Deep Creek Railway Bridge, Chowey
Exhibition Street: Degilbo Hall
607 Seccombes Road, off Maryborough - Biggenden Road: Degilbo Cemetery
The Official Register of Engineering Heritage Markers listed

 Degilbo-Mundubbera Railway Bridges in October 2016.  A total of 12 bridges that are situated on the Mungar to Mundubbera rail line, including the Chowey Bridge, are recognized with one Engineering Heritage Marker representing the “best example of a collection of historic railway bridges in Australia”.

Education 
There are no schools in Degilbo. The nearest primary schools are in Biggenden and Dallarnil while the nearest secondary schools are in Biggenden (to Year 10) and in Gayndah and Childers (both to Year 12).

References

External links

 Town map of Degilbo, 1975

Towns in Queensland
North Burnett Region
Localities in Queensland